The IAR 13 is a Romanian low-wing monoplane fighter-trainer aircraft designed before World War II.

Design and development

The powerplant  for  IAR 12, was  an IAR LD 450 12-cylinder W-form watercooled in-line built under license Lorraine-Dietrich 12 Eb, that offered 450 h.p. (336 kW) at 1,900 r.p.m., similar to the type fitted to the first C.V. 11. However, due to the increased aerodynamic drag, the maximum speed at ground level decreased to 294 km/h. This unsatisfactory result, combined with poor handling characteristics experienced during early test flights, constrained Carafoli to improve the construction and try a new engine.

The new project, called I.A.R. 13, was essentially similar to the abandoned '12', except for the fin-and-rudder. Its surface had been reduced and instead of a rounded shape it became oval. The fuselage, wings and the anti-crash pylon had all been retained, while the undercarriage suffered minor changes. The engine fitted to the airframe was a Hispano-Suiza 12Mc of 500 h.p. (373 kW) output at 2,200 r.p.m. that operated a two-blade, all-metal Ratier propeller. The more powerful engine helped to boost the top speed to 330 km/h, which meant a significant 12% increase. The overall flying characteristics were improved as well. Nevertheless, these significant results and the demonstration flights performed by Locotenent aviator Eugen "Puiu" Pârvulescu in 1933 did not impress the senior ARR leaders, still resistant to the new idea of a low-wing monoplane fighter.

Operators

Royal Romanian Air Force

Specifications (IAR 13)

See also

References

Bibliography

1930s Romanian fighter aircraft
13
Low-wing aircraft
Single-engined tractor aircraft